Enolmis saudita is a moth of the family Scythrididae. It was described by Pietro Passerin d'Entrèves in 1986. It is found in south-western Saudi Arabia and Yemen.

References

Scythrididae
Moths described in 1986